County routes in Tompkins County, New York, are signed with the Manual on Uniform Traffic Control Devices-standard yellow-on-blue pentagon route marker.

Routes 100–150

Routes 151 and up

See also

County routes in New York

Notes

References

External links

Tompkins County Highway Department – County Highway Map